Sgambelluri is a surname. Notable people with the surname include:

Melissa Sgambelluri (born 1983), American singer
Roberto Sgambelluri (born 1974), Italian cyclist